Homage to New York was a 1960 kinetic artwork and performance by Jean Tinguely.

Description 

Homage to New York was a kinetic artwork composed of found mechanical parts, including multiple bicycle wheels, a weather balloon, a piano, a radio, an American flag, a bassinet, and a toilet, all painted white. In its first and only performance, in the New York Museum of Modern Art sculpture garden on March 17, 1960, the machine whirred to life with the sounds and smells of its mechanical motion. The sculpture was split into sections that would activate at separate times, slowly turning the overall sculpture until, in its climax, the machine would destroy itself. In one section, the piano played while glass bottles dropped from above, shattering and making noxious odors. A youth go-kart scurried in front of the sculpture.

Production 

In February 1960, Museum of Modern Art curator for painting and sculpture, Peter Selz, commissioned artist Jean Tinguely to make a self-destructing machine to perform in the museum's sculpture garden. Tinguely found its components among scraps, junk, garbage dumps, and shops in New Jersey and New York City.

Tinguely intended for the work to reflect the excess and overabundance of modern living. Christina Chau described it as a "spectacle of abundance, from abundance" that produced nothing besides "motion".

References

Bibliography

Further reading 

 
 
 
 
 
 
 
 

1960 works
1960 sculptures
Destroyed sculptures
Kinetic art
Museum of Modern Art (New York City)
Performance art in New York City